880 (eight hundred [and] eighty) is the natural number following 879 and preceding 881.

It is the number of 4-by-4 magic squares.

And the triple factorial: 11!!! = 880.

880 is the frequency in hertz of the musical note A5.

880 is also:
 The code for international direct dialing phone calls to Bangladesh
 The year 880 BC or AD 880.
 Interstate 880, several Interstate highways in the United States.
 Dodge Custom 880, an automobile manufactured from 1962 to 1965.

References

Integers